Harold James Wiltse (August 6, 1903 – November 2, 1983) nicknamed "Whitey", was a professional baseball pitcher. He played all or part of four seasons in Major League Baseball between 1926 and 1931 for the Boston Red Sox (1926–28), St. Louis Browns (1928) and Philadelphia Phillies (1931). He was born in Clay City, Illinois.

Wiltse, nicknamed "Whitey", posted a 20–40 record with 134 strikeouts and a 4.87 ERA in 102 appearances, including 65 starts, 23 complete games, two shutouts, one save, and  innings pitched during his major league career. He also had an extensive minor league baseball career, spanning fifteen seasons from 1923 until 1937.

Wiltse died at the age of 80 in Bunkie, Louisiana.

External links

Retrosheet

Major League Baseball pitchers
Boston Red Sox players
Philadelphia Phillies players
St. Louis Browns players
Beaumont Exporters players
Mobile Bears players
Wichita Falls Spudders players
Milwaukee Brewers (minor league) players
Longview Cannibals players
San Antonio Missions players
Fort Worth Cats players
Baseball players from Illinois
1903 births
1983 deaths
People from Clay County, Illinois
People from Bunkie, Louisiana